Scratch video was a British video art movement that emerged in the early to mid-1980s. It was characterised by the use of found footage, fast cutting and multi-layered rhythms. It is significant in that, as a form of outsider art, it challenged many of the establishment assumptions of broadcast television - as well of those of gallery-bound video art.

Scratch Video arose in opposition to broadcast television, as (anti-)artists attempted to deal critically and directly with the impact of mass communications. The context these videos emerged in is important, as it tended to critique of the institutions making broadcast videos and the commercialism found on youth TV, especially MTV. This it did in form, content and in its mode of distribution.

Much of the work was politically radical, often containing images of a sexual or violent nature, and using images appropriated from mainstream media, including corporate advertising; using strategies inspired by the Situationist concept of detournement and William S. Burroughs’ theories of Electronic Revolution.

Context
The primary audience for scratch video in the early to mid-1980s, was in nightclub performances by industrial music bands such as The Anti-Group, Cabaret Voltaire, Nocturnal Emissions, Psychic TV, SPK, Test Dept, and Autopsia.  Some of those involved described their work as a form of cultural terrorism or as a form of anti-art.

In the mid-1980s typical London venues would be screenings at artist-run spaces such as the Ambulance Station, in independent cinemas such as the Brixton Ritzy Cinema, or the Fridge nightclub, which boasted an array of dozens of recycled colour televisions.  There was also significant distribution on VHS tape, following similar networks to cassette culture.

After Andy Lipman’s City Limits feature contextualised the art values of this practice, material began to be featured in small screenings in official art galleries such as the ICA and Tate.  Television stations, like Channel 4 began late night screenings of art videos, including scratch video. However, because much of the material was constructed using domestic VHS equipment, it was deemed both technically and legally unsuitable for broadcast (for fear of breaching copyright law).  Being highly politicised, some of the material also broke with the broadcaster’s criteria of balance.

Artists
Emergency Broadcast Network
George Barber
Dara Birnbaum
Joan Braderman
Cabaret Voltaire
Gorilla Tapes
Sandra Goldbacher
Richard Heslop
Nocturnal Emissions
Psychic TV
Systaime
Tom Fortunato
The Duvet Brothers

History
Scratch video is a rather catch-all category of work which derive from popular dance and music fashions and the cutting of found trash images with it. Its long history begins with the cubist collages of Picasso and Braque, the 'ready-mades' of Duchamp, and passes through Joseph Cornell, Bruce Conner, Andy Warhol and William S. Burroughs and Anthony Balch cut-ups. The movement was influenced by the American video artist Dara Birnbaum.

Speaking of the movements emergence and how  it got its name, Rik Lander (one half of the Duvet Brothers) has stated:

Original scratch video works continue to be shown in major exhibitions around the world. Notable events, amongst others, being Gorilla Tapes' participation in the ICA's 2007 exhibition The Secret Public: The Last Days of the British Underground 1978-1988 and SCRATCH! a 2008 retrospective exhibition curated by Paul Pieroni at the Seventeen gallery in London.

See also
Culture jamming
Plagiarism
Remix culture
VJing

References

Further reading
Video Art: A Guided tour Catherine Elwes London 2005 
Andy Lipman Scratch and Run City Limits London 

Visual arts media
Contemporary art